John Sigfried Johnson (May 11, 1873 – January 17, 1934) was an early American cyclist and speed skater. 

Johnson was the first to bicycle 1-mile in less than two minutes, or 1:56.6. This happened in 1892 at a racing track in Independence, Iowa. Besides racing on the track, early in his career he also competed in road races. Johnson was also a world record holder in speed skating, and won world championship titles in both sports. Later in his career, Johnson rode for racing teams sponsored by the bicycle manufacturers E.C. Stearns Bicycle Agency of Syracuse, N.Y., and Schwinn Bicycle Co. of Chicago. He retired from competitive cycling in 1900. He died January 17, 1934, in Minneapolis, Minnesota. He is buried in Lakewood Cemetery, Minneapolis.

See also
For more early American bicycle racing history, see the League of American Wheelmen and Major Taylor.

References

External links
In 2003, Johnson was introduced into the U.S. Bicycling Hall of Fame
In 1960, Johnson was introduced into the Speed Skaters Hall of Fame
Picture from a 1902 magazine, showing Johnson on bicycle behind a motorized tandem pacemaker, photo by Carl Horner, Boston.

1873 births
1934 deaths
American male cyclists
American people of Swedish descent
Place of birth missing
Sportspeople from Minneapolis